Darz and Sayeban Rural District is a rural district (dehestan) in the Central District of Larestan County, Fars Province, Iran. At the 2006 census, its population was 5,859, in 1,202 families.  The rural district has 28 villages.

References 

Rural Districts of Fars Province
Larestan County